Miko Mayama (born August 15, 1939 in Kyoto, Japan) is a Japanese-American actress who was active in the 1960s and 1970s.

Career
Mayama made several film and television appearances from the mid 1960s to the late 1970s. She had a supporting role in Hey Landlord! (1966); her guest appearances on series television include Valentine's Day (1965), I Spy (1966), Star Trek (1967), It Takes a Thief (1968), The Beverly Hillbillies (1971), Ironside (1971), Medical Center (1971-1972), Hawaii Five-O (1972), Kojak (1974), Mannix (1974) and M*A*S*H (1979).

Her films include Impasse (1969), The Hawaiians (1970), Amanda Fallon (1973), That Man Bolt (1973) and Cage Without a Key (1975).

Personal life
Mayama met Burt Reynolds in 1968 while she was working in Japan as a kabuki theater player.  Reynolds was in Japan to film Impasse and Mayama signed on as a fellow cast member.  They lived together from 1968 to 1971 and she learned English by watching Bugs Bunny cartoons, according to Reynolds' autobiography But Enough About Me.

Filmography 
 1965: Valentine's Day (Television series, a sequence)
 1965: Wendy and Me, a consequence (TV series)
 1965: Boeing Boeing
 1966: I Spy (I Spy, the TV series, a consequence)
 1966: Walk, Don't Run (Walk Don't Run)
 1966: Hey, Landlord (TV series)
 1967: F Troop (TV series), From Karate with Love
 1967: Star Trek (episode: "A Taste of Armageddon" and "Space Seed", character: Yeoman Tamura)
 1967: The War Wagon (The War Wagon)
 1968: It Takes a Thief, the TV series, a sequence
 1969: Impasse
 1969: Love, American Style (TV series)
 1969: The Courtship of Eddie's Father
 1970: The Flying Nun, a consequence (TV series)
 1970: The Hawaiians
 1970: Matt Lincoln (TV series), a sequence
 1971: To Rome with Love (TV series)
 1971: The Beverly Hillbillies, a sequence, three episodes (TV series)
 1971: Ironside (1967 TV series) (Ironside, the TV series, a consequence)
 1971-1972: Medical Center (TV series), two consequences
 1972: Hawaii Five-O (1968 TV series) Hawaii Five (Hawaii Five-O, the TV series, a consequence)
 1973: The Bold Ones: The New Doctors (TV series), a sequence
 1973: Amanda Fallon (TV movie)
 1973: That Man Bolt
 1974: Kojak (Kojak, the TV series, a consequence)
 1974: Mannix (TV series), a sequence
 1975: Cage Without a Key (TV movie)
 1979: M*A*S*H (television series, episode 7-18)

References

External links

 
 

1939 births
Living people
20th-century American actresses
American television actresses
American film actresses
American actresses of Japanese descent
American film actors of Asian descent
Western (genre) television actors
Japanese emigrants to the United States
21st-century American women